The A560 is a primary route that runs from the A56 in Altrincham, Greater Manchester, to Hattersley, Tameside. It follows a complex route that involves primary route, non-primary route, single and dual carriageway, some complex motorway junctions and, at one point, carriageways running on both sides of the M56 Motorway.

References 

Roads in England
Roads in Greater Manchester